Medina was a weekly women's magazine which was in circulation in the period 1941–1945 in Madrid, Spain. It was one of the publications of Sección Femenina, the women's branch of the Falange political party, which made public the messages of the institution during the much more radical era of the Francoist regime. Its subtitle was Seminario de la SF.

History and profile
Medina was established in 1941 and was one of the publications of the Sección Femenina targeting women. The first issue of the magazine appeared on 20 March 1941. Its publisher was Servicio de Prensa y Propaganda, a publishing company of Sección Femenina, in Madrid on a weekly basis.

Medina provided a model of fascist women which advocated loyalty and submission. At the same time it promoted progressive ideas for women which contradicted with the Catholic ideas. For instance, the magazine overtly encouraged the education for girls in 1942. However, it also suggested that the goal was to better train them for their future roles as mothers and supportive wives. Medina continuously emphasized the importance of housework for both Spanish economy and policies. One of the contributors was Constancia de la Mora. The magazine ceased publication in 1945, and the last issue was published on 30 December that year.

References

1941 establishments in Spain
1945 disestablishments in Spain
Defunct magazines published in Spain
Fascist newspapers and magazines
Former state media
Francoist Spain
Magazines established in 1941
Magazines disestablished in 1945
Magazines published in Madrid
Spanish-language magazines
Weekly magazines published in Spain
Women's magazines published in Spain